The Kiffing is a range of hills, relatively small in area and up to , in the district of Kassel in the German state of Hesse.

Geography 
The Kiffing hills in the extreme north of Hesse belong to the southern ranges of the Weser Uplands. They are located between the southern foothills of the Solling in the north and the northern foothills of the Bramwald in the south. To the northeast and north they are passed by the lower reaches of the river Schwülme, to the southwest and west by a stretch of the Upper Weser, beyond whose western banks looms the Reinhardswald. The Kiffing lies between Wahlsburg to the northwest, Uslar to the northeast and Oberweser to the south.

Landscape description 
The Kiffing, which attains at height of up to 344.1 m at the Heuberg, and whose eastern section belongs to the State Forest of Bad Karlshafen, is a heavily wooded region, apart from its western and northeastern foothills. In the north, above and to the southeast of the Pfeiffengrund valley, is the Lippoldsberg Clinic and Rehabilitation Centre. In the northeast above the Köhlergrund valley is the small Steinklippen and in the east, at the so-called Sattel, is a small rifle range.

Hills 
The hills and elevations of the Kiffing range include:

Streams 
The streams in and around the Kiffing include the: 
 Föhrenbach (tributary of the Weser) 
 Höllengraben (tributary of the Weser) 
 Rodenbach (tributary of the Schwülme) 
 Schwülme (tributary of the Weser) 
 Weser (river running into the North Sea)

Towns and villages 
The towns and villages located around the Kiffing are: 
 Lippoldsberg (Wahlsburg) in the northwest
 Vernawahlshausen (Wahlsburg) in the north
 Ahlbershausen (Uslar) in the east-northeast
 Arenborn (Oberweser) in the east
 Heisebeck (Oberweser) in the southeast
 Fürstenhagen (zu Uslar) in the south-southeast
 Oedelsheim (Oberweser) in the south
 Gieselwerder (Oberweser) in the southwest

Literature and sources 
The information in this article is based on: 
 Topografische Freizeitkarte "Naturpark Habichtswald / Reinhardswald" ('TF 50-HR', 1:50.000; 2003), herausgegeben vom 'Hessisch-Waldeckischen Gerbirgs- und Heimatverein eV.' und 'Hessischen Landesvermessungsamt'''
 Rad- u. Wanderkarte "Reinhardswald, Weserlauf u. Bramwald" (1:33.333), herausgegeben vom Geo-Verlag (Kaufungen)''

Kassel (district)
Forests and woodlands of Hesse
Regions of Hesse